The Kunja (Gunya) were an indigenous Australian people of the state of Queensland.

Country
Their western extension lay somewhere between Cooladdi and Cheepie. Their eastern boundary lay at the present day Morven and Angellala Creek. Charleville was on Kunja land.

Notes

Citations

Sources

Aboriginal peoples of Queensland